The Old Washoe Club (also known as simply Washoe Club) is a three-story brick structure in Virginia City, Nevada, USA, located in the Virginia City Historic District. The first story is currently occupied by commercial properties while the upper stories are unoccupied at this time. The building is an un-reinforced masonry building and, as such, has several deficiencies relative to its ability to resist seismic events. The building can be accessed through the main entrance on C Street. The Washoe Club was featured on Ghost Hunters in season 4, episode 8. The Ghost Adventures crew also investigated the club as part of their original documentary film.

References

External links
 The Washoe Club

1875 establishments in Nevada
Reportedly haunted locations in Nevada
Historic district contributing properties in Nevada
Buildings and structures in Virginia City, Nevada
Museums in Virginia City, Nevada
History museums in Nevada
National Register of Historic Places in Storey County, Nevada
Clubhouses on the National Register of Historic Places in Nevada